Ebenezer Edward Gostelow (18 December 1866 – 1944) was an Australian painter of flowers, birds and butterflies.

Early life
Gostelow was born in Sydney to Edward Gostelow and his second wife, Martha Taylor. His father had emigrated from Aylesbury, Buckinghamshire, England to Sydney in 1848 at the age of six.  In 1883, Gostelow entered the Education Department of New South Wales as a probationary pupil teacher. In 1887 he won a scholarship, one of only 15 candidates selected statewide. He was awarded the coveted scholarship to the Teachers' Training College and later was awarded the Blue Ribbon and took charge of the First Class Schools. After his apprenticeship in the city he took charge of country schools and over the next 20 years he spent his time in Nundle on the Great Dividing Range near Tamworth and in Condobolin, Warren, Harden, Cootamundra and Broken Hill, where he became headmaster of South Public School.

Roaming the state of New South Wales he soon acquired a keen interest in all forms of nature study and, while imparting his love of bird life to his classes with coloured chalk on the blackboard, discovered his natural gift as an artist. Without formal training, Gostelow embarked on a project to paint as many wild flowers and birds as he could.

In 1890, Gostelow married Ada Mary Finney with whom he had three sons and a daughter. His youngest son, Clifford, shared his father's passion for nature study and on his father's death he inherited the collection of native flora paintings.

In 1920 while Gostelow was in Broken Hill, the Barrier Field Naturalists Club held a wildflower show in the technical college. One of its purposes was to promote the study and protection of the area's wildflowers. The display included 150 botanical paintings by Gostelow. They were considered the highlight of the show.

On retiring he reworked many of his earlier paintings to improve them as he considered them inaccurate. Gostelow also set out and achieved the huge task of painting all the known and recorded species of birds in Australia. His skill and integrity were well known and respected to the extent that the Australian Museum, amongst other institutions, loaned him stuffed birds from which he worked. His completed collection of 730 mostly life size paintings, illustrating the male and the female of each species with the flora native to their habitat also contained the Museum's registration number and explanatory notes.

National Library Collection
The complete collection of over 800 flora and fauna paintings is now held in the Pictures Collection, National Library of Australia, Canberra. The bird paintings were bequeathed to the Library on Gostelow's death. Clifford Gostelow donated his inherited collection of flora paintings to the Library in 1969. The collection is represented in For the Love of Nature: E.E. Gostelow's Birds and Flowers (2010).

Many of Gostelow's images have been digitised by the National Library. A number of his bird pictures have also been included in two National Library poetry publications. Twelve Gostelow paintings are used to illustrate a revised version of Judith Wright's Birds (2003).

Death
E. E. Gostelow died in 1944 in the Sydney suburb of Burwood before he could complete his next project of painting all of Australia's butterflies.

References 

Australian National Botanic Gardens biography extracted from: Jennifer Phipps (1986) Artists' Gardens – Flowers and Gardens in Australian Art 1780s-1980s, Bay Books, Sydney. [consult for source references] and pers. Comm.. Jean Ffrench, Canberra (2004)
Mattingley, Dr Christobel, Article 5, NLA News, November 2005, Volume XVI, Number 2

External links 
Pictures Collection, National Library of Australia, Canberra

See also
 List of Australian botanical illustrators

Botanical illustrators
1866 births
1944 deaths
Australian illustrators
19th-century Australian painters
20th-century Australian painters
Australian bird artists